Above the Law was an American hip hop group from Pomona, California, founded in 1989 by Cold 187um, KMG the Illustrator, Go Mack, and DJ Total K-Oss.

Biography
In 1989, the group signed with Eazy-E's Ruthless Records, while there, the group became an additional influence in pioneering with the group, N.W.A. Their first album on Ruthless, 1990's Livin' Like Hustlers, featured a guest appearance from N.W.A and production from Dr. Dre. Above the Law member Cold187um worked closely with Dre on production and the two had great influence on each other. The songs "Untouchable" and "Murder Rap" became minor hits from the album. "Murder Rap" appeared in the 2008 film Pineapple Express. The song "Freedom of Speech" appeared in the 1990 movie Pump Up the Volume and was also featured on the movie Pump Up the Volume (soundtrack)|soundtrack album. In September 1990, members of hip hop act Above the Law clashed with Ice Cube and his posse Da Lench Mob during the annual New Music Seminar conference.

The group's first full-length album, Livin' Like Hustlers, came out in 1990. This album, released before Dr. Dre's The Chronic, featured a similar G-Funk sound to that album. Cold187um has claimed that he was the first to pioneer the G-Funk style and Dr. Dre's new sound was largely inspired by his own sound on that album. Dre by this point had left Ruthless Records for Death Row Records. Two years later in 1994 the group released Uncle Sam's Curse, which was their last album on Ruthless Records. It contained the minor hit "Black Superman".

Shortly after Eazy-E's death, the group signed to Tommy Boy Records in 1996. There they released Time Will Reveal in 1996 and Legends In 1999, the group signed to Suge Knight's Death Row Records but left in 2002. The group was a part of the West Coast Rap All-Stars, contributing to "We're All in the Same Gang", a 1990 collaboration of West Coast hip-hop artists that assembled for this song to promote an anti-violence message.

On the morning of July 7, 2012, it was confirmed by multiple sources that emcee KMG the Illustrator had died. Longtime Above the Law affiliate Kokane confirmed the death of the rapper on his Twitter account on the same day. The cause of his death is unknown; although Big Hutch says he died of a heart attack while taking a shower.     He was 43 years old.

Four of the group's most popular music videos, "Black Superman", "Call it What U Want" feat. Tupac, "V.S.O.P.", and the long form music video, "V.S.O.P. REMIX" were written and directed by Marty Thomas, who was Eazy-E's longtime Ruthless Records film director. Thomas also wrote and directed the controversial and eventually banned "Uncle Sam's Curse" Album television commercials which featured disturbing images of the KKK chasing ATL past a church with burning torches and a white "Uncle Sam" pulling a newborn African-American baby from his Mother's arms. The commercial won several prestigious worldwide awards.

According to Kokane, a new Above the Law album had recorded before the death of KMG. According to current member Cold 187um 30+ unreleased tracks have been recorded while KMG was still alive. "Victims of Global Politics" has rumored to be the title. However, no release date has been set.

Above the Law claims to have invented the "G-funk" sound, which was made popular by Dr. Dre's The Chronic.

Discography

Studio albums
 Livin' Like Hustlers (1990) 
 Black Mafia Life (1993)
 Uncle Sam's Curse (1994)
 Time Will Reveal (1996)
 Legends (1998)
 Forever: Rich Thugs, Book One (1999)
 Sex, Money & Music (2009)

Extended plays
 Vocally Pimpin' (1991)

References

External links 
Above The Law at Discogs
 Above The Law Epic and Truthful Radio Interview 2010

African-American musical groups
G-funk groups
Gangsta rap groups
Giant Records (Warner) artists
Tommy Boy Records artists
Ruthless Records artists
Musical groups from Los Angeles
Hip hop groups from California
Death Row Records artists
1989 establishments in California